Darma Raja Seenivasagam (Tamil: தார்ம ராஜா சீனிவசகம்) (1925, Ipoh - 15 March 1969, Ipoh) was a prominent leader of the People's Progressive Party (Malaysia) (PPP) which before 1959 was known as Perak Progressive Party . He was of Ceylonese Tamil ancestry; his father was a Ceylonese lawyer from Jaffna.

He founded the PPP along with his brother, Dato' S. P. Seenivasagam in 1953 after breaking away from the Labour Party. They were both prominent lawyers in Malaya prior to forming the party. The PPP's stronghold was in Perak and it received a lot of support, especially from the ethnic Chinese voters.

In the 1954 elections, first in which PPP was participating, he was elected to the Town Council of Ipoh and Menglembu under the ‘Alliance’ ticket (UMNO, Malayan Chinese Association, Malayan Indian Congress). He lost in the 1955 Federal Elections but won a seat in the by-elections in 1956.

Seenivasagam was elected in a by-election in 1957 to the Ipoh parliamentary seat vacated by Tun Leong Yew Koh who went on to become Malacca's first Governor.

While in the opposition, Seenivasagam lead the PPP to form the Malaysian Solidarity Council (MSC) in 1965 comprising multi-racial parties like the People's Action Party and the United Democratic Party (UDP). At the MSC's first and only general meeting, several leaders from these parties gave speeches supporting a Malaysian Malaysia. Seenivasagam in his speech accused the Alliance of using Article 153 of the Constitution of Malaysia to "bully non-Malays".

In the parliamentary elections of 1959, the PPP won all the four seats in Perak. The PPP repeated its success in 1969.

D. R. Seenivasagam Park, formerly known as Coronation Park, is named after the famous politician. It is located in the heart of Ipoh (New Town) and is famous for its scenic beauty and recreational facilities. It comprises recreational fields, an artificial lake filled with fish, a nursery for potted plants and a children's traffic playground. The latest addition is the newly landscaped Japanese garden featuring a Japanese carp pond.

References

20th-century Malaysian lawyers
Malaysian people of Sri Lankan Tamil descent
Malaysian people of Tamil descent
Sri Lankan Tamil politicians
Malaysian Hindus
Malaysian politicians of Tamil descent
1925 births
Malaysian people of Indian descent
1969 deaths
Malaysian politicians of Indian descent
People from Ipoh
Malaysian political party founders
Members of the Dewan Rakyat
Members of the Perak State Legislative Assembly
People's Progressive Party (Malaysia) politicians